Daruma Magazine was a quarterly English language magazine published in Amagasaki, Japan and devoted to Japanese art and antiques. It was published by Takeguchi Momoko and edited by author Alistair Seton. It commenced publication in 1993.  In addition to the major articles, each issue contained brief articles on haiku, woodblock prints, and ikebana.  The magazine ceased publication in 2011, with Issue 70 (Vol. 18, No. 2) being its last.

Footnotes

External links
 The magazine’s website

1993 establishments in Japan
2011 disestablishments in Japan
Antiques
Defunct magazines published in Japan
English-language magazines
Japanese art
Magazines established in 1994
Magazines disestablished in 2011
Mass media in Amagasaki
Quarterly magazines
Visual arts magazines